Sally James (born Sally Cann, 10 May 1950) is a former presenter on the ITV Saturday morning children's show Tiswas from 1977 until it ended in 1982. James's role on the show included conducting the "Almost Legendary Pop Interviews", interviewing  musical acts including Elvis Costello, Sting, The Clash, Motörhead, and Kate Bush, and serving as music editor.

Before joining Tiswas, James was an actress, appearing in the films To Sir, with Love (1967), Journey to the Unknown (1969), The Railway Children (1970), and Never Too Young to Rock (1975). Her television roles included parts in Castle Haven (1969), Cousin Bette (1971), and The Black Arrow (1973–74). She was a presenter on Saturday Scene (later known as Supersonic Saturday Scene), starting in 1974, and interviewed pop stars in a segment of the show. James was a member of the Four Bucketeers group, whose single "Bucket Of Water Song" reached No. 26 in the UK Singles Chart in 1980. Her book Sally James' Almost Legendary Pop Interviews was published in 1981.

After Tiswas ended in 1982, James presented Ultra Quiz and Six Fifty-five Special, the latter being a nightly BBC Two programme co-presented by James with David Soul. She now runs a business selling school uniforms.

Early life and career
Sally James was born in Chiswick on 10 May 1950, the daughter of Olive and Bob Cann. Bob Cann was a photographer, who later worked as the official photographer for the films Dr. No and A Hard Day's Night. James attended the Arts Educational Schools. She appeared as one of Sidney Poitier's pupils in To Sir, with Love (1967), credited as Sally Cann, after her father, who was working on the film spoke to the director and got her the part. She subsequently used her father's middle name, James, in her stage name.

She appeared in Castle Haven (1969), a twice-weekly serial for Yorkshire Television, playing Jo Mercer, a woman newly married to a teacher. In the series, the couple are tenants of one of the flats in a pair of converted houses and are struggling financially. James Towler in The Stage reviewed the programme including the comment "more performances of the quality of Sally James would undoubtedly enhance the future of the series." She played the role of a "" in the comedy Turnbull's Finest Half-Hour (1972), which was set in a fictional television station, and was one of the cast praised for their performances in Towler's review in The Stage.

Her television roles included parts in Sanctuary, Dixon of Dock Green, Curry & Chips, Journey to the Unknown, Cousin Bette, The Two Ronnies, and  The Black Arrow. Film roles included The Railway Children (1970) as a maid, and in the glam rock film Never Too Young to Rock (1975).

Presenting career
James started her first presenting role in 1973, for Saturday Scene, during which she interviewed pop stars, including David Essex and The Bay City Rollers in a quarter-hour long section of the show. The show was later Supersonic Saturday Scene, and broadcast at different times in different ITV regions, including as a Saturday morning show in London. An album, Saturday Scene, that included both interviews and songs performed by James, was released in 1974. The review in The Stage called James "an ebullient personality in sound as well as vision", adding that "disc, screen or stage she's got the potential to adorn all of them." Paul Brookman of The Thanet Times thought that although the programme was popular, the album would have limited appeal as the interviews would soon be outdated, and "after hearing the album a few times it has nothing to offer."

In October 1976, the BBC started devoting a three-hour slot on BBC1 on Saturday mornings to a new show, Multi-Coloured Swap Shop, which The Stage noted put the new programme "in direct competition with ITV's Saturday Scene presented by Sally James." By July 1977, Multi-Coloured Swap Shop attracted six million weekly viewers nationally, whilst Saturday Scene, which was not broadcast across all ITV regions, had three million viewers in London. Meanwhile, ATV had produced the Saturday morning children's show Tiswas since 1974, which was shown only in the ATV region until also being screened in the ITV Wales & West from 1976. It was announced that James and Jim Davidson would be joining the show, alongside existing hosts Chris Tarrant and Trevor East, for the series starting on 10 September 1977, and that the programme would be broadcast in three additional ITV regions. The following year, Tiswas was reduced from three to two hours duration, with Tarrant becoming the producer, as well as being a main host beside James, and East taking a reduced role.

James's role on the show included conducting the "Almost Legendary Pop Interviews", interviewing many famous musical acts including Elvis Costello, Sting, The Clash, Motörhead, and The Pretenders. James remained as a presenter until the show ended in 1982. She was also music editor for the show. James was a member of the group the Four Bucketeers, alongside other Tiswas cast members Tarrant, John Gorman and Bob Carolgees. The group released the single "Bucket Of Water Song", which reached No. 26 in the UK Singles Chart in 1980 and undertook a national concert tour.

A collection of her interviews, titled Sally James Almost Legendary Pop Interviews, was published as a book in 1981. It included interviews with Kate Bush, Motörhead, Adam Ant, Bad Manners, Roger Daltrey and Kim Wilde among others. Several of the interviewee pictures used in the book were taken by her father, Bert Cann. Paul Taylor's Popular music since 1955 : a critical guide to the literature (1985) says that "The quality varies widely from serious dialogues to those in which the interviewer is not being taken at all seriously."

Marion McMullen of the Coventry Evening Telegraph wrote in 2003 that "Tiswas turned [James] into a cult favourite and 21 years later she is still remembered as the woman who first brought sex appeal to children's telly." A piece in The Times in 1998 said "Kids at home adored the chaos ... while their dads admired the denim-clad charms of Sally James."; for The Guardian in 2007, Bibi van der Zee commented that James "was openly touted as, er, getting dads up in the morning".

James was one of the presenters of the first series of TVS show Ultra Quiz (1983), alongside Michael Aspel and Jonathan King. The programme, a version of the Japanese game show Trans America Ultra Quiz, started with 2,000 contestants, who were reduced to a final pair, by eliminating participants who answered questions wrongly, taking place at a variety of locations. The winner's prize was £10,000, a large amount for a British quiz show at the time. TVS controller Michael Blakstad described the show as "quite awful," and it was revamped for the following season with a new presenting team.

In the 1984-85 pantomime season, James appeared in the title role in Aladdin at the Towngate Theatre, Poole, whilst pregnant. In The Stage, Stan Sowden wrote that James "establishe[d] a quick rapport with the audience, particularly the younger members." After a career break, James appeared on Back to the Drawing Board in 1986 and guested on Countdown for a week in 1987.

Later career
Some 25 years after Tiswas ended, James presented a reunion show Tiswas Reunited alongside Tarrant on ITV on 16 June 2007. Lasting 90 minutes, the show featured contributions from celebrities who enjoyed the show as children and appearances by people who had been on the show. In 2010 she had a programme on BBC WM.

James appeared on stage in Harpenden for Christmas 2013 as Fairy in the pantomime Jack and the Beanstalk'', around 30 years after her previous pantomime appearance. As of 2014 she was running a business selling school uniforms in Cobham, Surrey.

She is married to agent and entrepreneur Mike Smith. They have three sons. She lives near Effingham, Surrey.

FilmographyPantomime'''

Discography

References

External links
 Personal website
 
 
 Saturday Scene album at Discogs.com

1950 births
English radio DJs
English television actresses
English television presenters
British women television presenters
Living people
People from Chiswick
Television personalities from Surrey
British radio presenters
British women radio presenters